The 2016 Big Ten women's basketball tournament was a postseason tournament was held from March 2–6, 2016 at Bankers Life Fieldhouse in Indianapolis. Maryland won their 2nd Big Ten Women's Tournament and earn an automatic trip to the NCAA women's basketball tournament.

Seeds

All 14 Big Ten schools participate in the tournament. Teams were seeded by 2015–16 Big Ten Conference season record. The top 10 teams received a first-round bye and the top 4 teams received a double bye.

Seeding for the tournament was determined at the close of the regular conference season:

Schedule

*Game times in Eastern Time. #Rankings denote tournament seeding.

Bracket

See also
 2016 Big Ten Conference men's basketball tournament

References

Big Ten women's basketball tournament
Tournament
Big Ten women's basketball tournament
Big Ten women's basketball tournament
Basketball competitions in Indianapolis
College basketball tournaments in Indiana
Women's sports in Indiana